Payagpur is a constituency of the Uttar Pradesh Legislative Assembly covering the city of Payagpur in the Bahraich district of Uttar Pradesh, India.

Payagpur is one of five assembly constituencies in the Kaiserganj Lok Sabha constituency. Since 2008, this assembly constituency is numbered 287 amongst 403 constituencies.

Currently this seat belongs to Bharatiya Janta Party candidate Subhash Tripathi who won in last Assembly election of 2017 Uttar Pradesh Legislative Elections defeating Samajwadi Party candidate Mukesh Srivastava by a margin of 41,541 votes. Mukesh Srivastava is the first MLA of Payagpur constituent assembly.

References

External links
 

Assembly constituencies of Uttar Pradesh
Politics of Bahraich district